Anna Stein (born 21 October 1949) is a German gymnast. She competed in six events at the 1968 Summer Olympics.

References

1949 births
Living people
German female artistic gymnasts
Olympic gymnasts of West Germany
Gymnasts at the 1968 Summer Olympics
Sportspeople from Novi Sad